{{DISPLAYTITLE:C29H33FO6}}
The molecular formula C29H33FO6 (molar mass: 496.58 g/mol, exact mass: 496.2261 u) may refer to:

 Amcinafide, or triamcinolone acetophenide
 Betamethasone benzoate